Sultanganj is a town located in the Bhagalpur district of the India state of Bihar.

Demographics
As per the Census 2011, the literacy rate of Sultanganj is 70%. Thus Sultanganj has a higher literacy rate compared to 63.1% of Bhagalpur district. The male literacy rate is 65.4% and the female literacy rate is 52.2% in Sultanganj.

Shravani Mela
Shravani Mela is a month-long festival that is celebrated in July - August of every year by devotees of Lord Shiva.
Devotees from all over the world come to this holy place and start their 100+ KM journey to another shrine city of Deoghar in Jharkhand over the foot.

See also
 Sultanganj Buddha

People from Sultanganj
 Sanjay Jha, chairman and CEO of Motorola Mobility

References

Cities and towns in Anga Desh
Cities and towns in Bhagalpur district